Ainsley Katharine Smart (born February 25, 1995) is an American pop singer from Bedford, New Hampshire. Her solo breakthrough single "Way Too Easy" has garnered over 1 million views and was featured on radio stations across the globe. There is currently a film in production entitled "Ainsley" about her journey in the music industry.

Early life 
Ainsley Smart was born in Abington, Pennsylvania. Her parents are divorced. She is a citizen in Ireland, the United States and Great Britain. She grew up playing soccer, competing in Tae-Kwon-Do where she currently holds a 4th degree black belt, surfing, skateboarding and mountain biking. At age 15, she was discovered online by talent manager and producer Jay Levine, and spent the remainder of her teen years working within the music industry, before ultimately leaving to travel the world, the story of which is currently being made into a feature-length documentary film. At age 21, Smart moved to Switzerland.

Career 

In August 2019, she began to record her debut album 'The Truth' in Malibu, California. She spent the next two years traveling the world and recording the album with producer/engineer Steve Baughman. Her debut single 'Way Too Easy' was released on August 23, 2021, and has since garnered several million views across social media platforms, and was played on radio stations across Europe. In November 2021, she became the first independent artist to cover Rollercoaster Magazine. In November 2021, she released her second single 'Blame Me'. The music video for "Blame Me" was filmed in the Langham Hotel in London.

In 2019, production began on a feature-length documentary entitled "Ainsley", which would document her journey to become the first female artist in history without a major label to have a 'Number 1 record'.

Discography

Singles

References 

1995 births
Living people
American women pop singers
American women singer-songwriters
People from Bedford, New Hampshire